"I Will Survive" is a song by American singer Gloria Gaynor, released in October 1978 as the second single from her sixth album, Love Tracks (1978). It was written by Freddie Perren and Dino Fekaris. A top-selling song, it is a popular disco anthem, as well as being certified Platinum by the Recording Industry Association of America (RIAA).

The song's lyrics describe the narrator's discovery of personal strength following an initially devastating breakup. It received heavy airplay in 1979, spending three non-consecutive weeks at number one on the Billboard Hot 100 as well as topping the UK Singles Chart and Irish Singles Chart. The song is also frequently recalled as a symbol of female empowerment. In 2016, the Library of Congress deemed Gaynor's original recording to be "culturally, historically, or artistically significant" and selected it for preservation in the National Recording Registry.

Composition and recording
According to Dino Fekaris, the principal writer of the song, "I Will Survive" has its genesis in his experience getting fired by Motown Records in the mid-1970s after seven years working there as a staff writer. Jobless, he turned on the TV in his room, and a theme song he had written for the film Generation (performed by Rare Earth) happened to be playing. He took it as a good omen, and jumped up and down on the bed saying, "I'm going to make it. I'm going to be a songwriter. I will survive!". Fekaris teamed up with his collaborator Freddie Perren, another former member of the Motown production team, to write the song; however, the song remained unrecorded for two years as no suitable singer was available.

In 1978, Perren was asked by Polydor to produce "Substitute" for Gloria Gaynor, which he agreed on the understanding that he could also produce the B-side. When Gaynor was asked what kind of songs she liked, she said she liked "songs that are meaningful, have good lyrics, and touch people's hearts." The producers then handed her the song lyrics of "I Will Survive" scribbled on a piece of brown paper. Gaynor recognized the song as a hit immediately.

According to Robert "Boogie" Bowles who played guitar on the song, in the three-hour recording session, the session musicians spent most of their time recording the A side, "Substitute". As a result, they only had 35 minutes to record the B-side "I Will Survive". They also did not even know the song title or the melody of the song, but they were fairly relaxed recording it in the belief that the B-side would likely not be played. Based only on the chord changes and a few notes, they improvised freely much of the backing track, and Bowles filled in the bare bone of the tune with jazzy blues licks. Due to the difference in the intro from the main body of the tune which made a smooth transition difficult, it was recorded in two parts and then spliced together. Gaynor then recorded the vocals wearing a back brace, having just had a surgery due to a fall at a concert. The injury and a recent bereavement made Gaynor identify with the sentiment of "I Will Survive": "That's why I was able to sing the song with so much conviction".

Releases
Although Gaynor was convinced that "I Will Survive" would be a hit and tried to persuade the label to release it as the A side, the label refused to entertain the idea and it was released as the B-side to "Substitute". Gaynor's husband took the song to the Studio 54 DJ Richie Kaczor, who loved it. Gaynor gave Kaczor a stack of the records to give to his friends. Other DJs in discos and radio stations soon followed and played that side of the record instead. The popularity of "I Will Survive" led to the label releasing the song as an A side. To support the single, a video shot at Xenon Discotheque in New York was released. It featured a roller skater Sheila Reid-Pender from a local group called The Village Wizards skate dancing on the dance floor. 
 
The original A side "Substitute" appeared on the Billboard Hot Soul Singles chart for four weeks starting October 14, 1978, peaking at No. 78. It also appeared on the Billboard Bubbling Under the Hot 100 chart for four weeks in October–November 1978, peaking at No. 107. "I Will Survive" on the other hand performed significantly better; it entered the Billboard Hot 100 in December that year and reached No. 1 on the chart in March 1979. The song received the Grammy Award for Best Disco Recording in 1980, the only year the award was given.

Remixes
Following the success of fellow 1970s disco stars Sister Sledge with remixed singles in the UK in 1993, "I Will Survive" was also remixed and released that summer. This remix reached number five on the UK Singles Chart and number three on the UK Dance Singles Chart. It also peaked at number six in Ireland and number nine in Portugal. In 1999, a remix of the song charted in France, peaking at number 23. And in 2000, another remix reached number six in Spain. In November 2013, Gaynor released a gospel album entitled We Will Survive, which includes a new, updated remix of "I Will Survive" by DJ Shpank in both extended and radio edit formats. In 2018, a remix again charted in France, peaking at number 12.

Music video
A promotional video was filmed in 1979 at a New York discothèque called Xenon. It features Gaynor singing, interspersed with roller skating dance sequences performed by Sheila Reid-Pender of Harlem, a member of the skating group The Village Wizards. Although three videos were filmed that day, the "I Will Survive" video was the only one to survive. Gaynor was not present during the taping of the roller skating segment of the video.

Gaynor and Pender met for the first time on July 7, 2014, in New York at the 92nd St. YMCA after Gaynor's lecture and promotional signing of her book We Will Survive. In the book, Gaynor wrote, "I wanted everybody—including myself—to believe that we could survive."

In 2022, the video was remastered in HD and officially uploaded to Gaynor's YouTube channel, obtaining over 4.5 million views in two months.

Impact and legacy
VH1 ranked "I Will Survive" number one in their list of 100 Greatest Dance Songs in 2000.

Rolling Stone ranked it number 489 in their List of Rolling Stone's 500 Greatest Songs of All Time in 2004, number 492 in 2010, and number 251 in 2021.

Billboard placed it at number 97 in their ranking of The Billboard Hot 100 All-Time Top Songs in 2008.

In 2012, "I Will Survive" was ranked number two in Rolling Stone poll of The Best Disco Songs of All Time.

The Daily Telegraph ranked it number 48 in their The 100 Greatest Songs of All Time list in November 2016.

Paste Magazine ranked the song number seven in their The 60 Best Dancefloor Classics list in 2017.

Pitchfork featured it in their list of 50 Songs That Define the Last 50 Years of LGBTQ+ Pride in 2018. They added,

"'I Will Survive' probably would've become a gay anthem even without the specter of AIDS. It has an undeniable flair for the dramatic: After moving through that filigreed piano intro, you can imagine a lone spotlight shining on Gloria Gaynor as she drags the man dumb enough to break her heart and crawl back for more. It was released as disco's wave was beginning to break, topping the Billboard charts a few months before the infamous Disco Demolition Night at Comiskey Park. Had the story ended there, it'd represent the last, best gasp of a culture beaten into temporary irrelevance by thinly-veiled racism and homophobia."

In 1998, the French football (soccer) team made "I Will Survive" their unofficial anthem, particularly focusing on the instrumental sub-theme to sing "la la la la la". The team ended up winning the World Cup and the song enjoyed immense popular enthusiasm amongst younger generations in the country 20 years after its original release. The chant was originally inspired by a remix of song by Hermes House Band, but Gaynor later released a version with the "la la la la la" chant included.

Accolades

Personnel
Vocals: Gloria Gaynor
Drums: James Gadson
Percussion: Paulinho Da Costa
Bass guitar: Scott Edwards
Keyboards: Freddie Perren
Guitars: Bob "Boogie" Bowles, Melvin "Wah Wah Watson" Ragin
Strings and horns: arranged and conducted by Dave Blumberg

Official versions
Recorded by Gloria Gaynor
 "I Will Survive" (1978 single version) – 3.15
 "I Will Survive" (1978 album version) – 4.56
 "I Will Survive" (1978 12" Mix) – 8.02
 "Yo Viviré" (I Will Survive Spanish 12" Mix) – 7.55
 "I Will Survive" (Tom Moulton Mix) – 10.33
 "I Will Survive" (2009 re-recording) – 5.35
 "I Will Survive" (2009 re-recording Spanish version) - 5.37

Charts

Weekly charts

Year-end charts

All-time charts

Sales and certifications

Billie Jo Spears version

Background and recording
"I Will Survive" was notably covered by American country artist, Billie Jo Spears in 1979. Spears had become known for several popular country singles that exemplified strong women. This included a song about sexual harassment ("Mr. Walker, It's All Over") and a tune about a woman walking away from a bad relationship ("Standing Tall"). Among these recordings was her cover of "I Will Survive". The track was produced in February 1979 by Larry Butler at the Jack Clement Recording Studio (located in Nashville, Tennessee).

Release, chart performance and reception
Spears's cover of "I Will Survive" was released in March 1979 by United Artists Records. It was backed on the B-side by the song, "Rainy Days and Stormy Nights". The disc was released as a seven-inch vinyl record. The single entered the American Billboard Hot Country Songs chart in April 1979. It spent a total of eleven weeks on the chart, climbing to the number 21 position in June 1979. In Canada, the song was more commercially-successful, peaking at number nine on their RPM Country Tracks chart. It also became her fourth single to chart in the United Kingdom, reaching number 47. It was released on Spears's 1979 album of the same name. In 1980, the tune was nominated by the Grammy Awards for Best Female Country Vocal Performance. It was Spears's only nomination from the Grammy's.

Spears's cover followed a similar disco style to that of Gaynor's original. Rolling Stone placed on its 2018 list titled, "Country Disco: 15 Great, Wild and WTF Songs". Writer Stephen L. Betts stated, "With the familiar piano opening by Hargus "Pig" Robbins and backing vocals from The Jordanaires, the Grammy-nominated country-meets-western-meets-Studio 54 concoction remains deliciously odd and totally irresistible." While a success in the multiple markets, Spears later reflected, "It is still a country record. I could never go pop with my mouthful of firecrackers." Spears also commented that she found the song difficult to sing live. "That is a very difficult song to sing. There are so many words in it and they come so fast," she stated.

Track listing
7" vinyl single
 "I Will Survive" – 3:16
 "Rainy Days and Stormy Nights" – 2:35

Charts

Hermes House Band version
Dutch group Hermes House Band covered the song in 1994, retitled "I Will Survive (La La La)", topping both the Dutch Top 40 and Single Top 100 charts. In 1998 and 2018, their version reached number one on the French hitlist after the win from the French Team at the FIFA World Cup.

Charts

Weekly charts

Year-end charts

Sales and certifications

Chantay Savage version

American singer Chantay Savage covered "I Will Survive" in 1996 as a ballad. It was released as the first single from her second album, I Will Survive (Doin' It My Way) (1996). This version peaked at number 24 on the US Billboard Hot 100, and was certified Gold by the Recording Industry Association of America (RIAA). It also peaked at number 12 on the UK Singles Chart and number 52 on the Eurochart Hot 100.

Critical reception
Michael Hill from Cash Box commented, "What a track! What a vocal performance performance! If not for the title, it’s hard to tell that this song is a remake of the still-popular Gloria Gaynor track. Steve “Silky” Hurley outdid himself on this track and it’s difficult to decide which of the four mixes to play. Chantay delivers a smooth, easy and controlled vocal performance which should make her version a big hit. Expect huge radio play and quite possibly some “tin” for this little lady." Alan Jones from Music Week described Savage's version as a "sublime R&B-flavoured rendition". Gerald Martinez from New Sunday Times wrote, "Chantay has a fabulous voice, with a great range and rich, chocolatey tone, in the Anita Baker mould. She performs the old hit, I Will Survive, at a slower sexier pace than the original, making it a very different statement than the rousing anthemic style of the original. This is a more personal, more vulnerable version. Nice track indeed."

Track listing
 12-inch single
A1. "I Will Survive" (Puff Daddy "Bad Boy Mix")
A2. "I Will Survive" (Silk's Old Skool Extended Mix with Clean Rap)
A3. "I Will Survive" (Original LP version – edit)
B1. "I Will Survive" (Silk's Classic House Mix)
B2. "I Will Survive" (Rhythm Radio version)

Charts

Weekly charts

Year-end charts

Diana Ross version

American singer Diana Ross released a cover of "I Will Survive" in 1996. It was released on April 14, as the fourth and final single from her twenty-first album, Take Me Higher (1995). The song is produced by Narada Michael Walden and peaked at number 14 in the United Kingdom. It also reached number three in Iceland and number 16 in Scotland. In the United States, it peaked at number 37 on the Billboard Hot Dance Club Play chart.

Critical reception
Larry Flick from Billboard wrote, "The kicker is a delicious cover of Gloria Gaynor's "I Will Survive", produced by Narada Michael Walden. Interestingly, that is the number that stands out in the legendary artist's current (and oh-so-festive) -hour show." Gil L. Robertson IV from Cash Box picked it as a "standout track" of the Take Me Higher album. The Daily Vault's Mark Millan constated that it is "dealt with superbly, as the team managed to breathe new life into an old relic from the distant, dark days when disco ruled." Alan Jones from Music Week stated that "the combination of two old favourites is bound to win favour with many people, and new dance mixes by Roger Sanchez will ease the track's path to success now it is a single." James Hamilton from the magazine's RM Dance Update noted the "galloping good Hi-NRG 0-134bpm Motiv 8 Club Vocal and Hell Razor Dub". Pop Rescue concluded that this cover "definitely belts it out – vocally and musically".

Track listings

 UK CD single
 "I Will Survive" - 4:48
 "I Will Survive" (Roger Sanchez Atmospheric Mix) - 4:31
 "I Will Survive" (Motiv 8 Radio Mix) - 3:58
 "Voice of the Heart" - 4:55

 European CD maxi single
 "I Will Survive" (Album Version) - 4:46
 "I Will Survive" (Roger Sanchez Radio Edit) - 4:02
 "I Will Survive" (Motiv 8 Radio Edit) - 3:56
 "I Will Survive" (Sure Is Pure Vocal) - 8:58

Charts

Cake version

American rock band Cake covered "I Will Survive" in a soft rock-style for their second album, Fashion Nugget (1996). In addition to many subtle changes, lead singer John McCrea altered the lyrics. In an interview, Gaynor stated she did not like Cake's version of the song because it used "profanity" (McCrea changed the phrase "I should've changed that stupid lock" to "...that fucking lock").

The music video of Cake's version features McCrea as a city parking enforcement officer driving around in a Cushman three-wheeled scooter as he leaves tickets on various cars. Their version peaked at number 28 on the US Billboard Modern Rock Tracks chart in March 1997.

Critical reception
Daina Darzin from Cash Box felt that the band is "at its bizarre best" on "the thoroughly and charmingly mangled version" of the Gloria Gaynor disco classic. A reviewer from Music Week rated the song three out of five, describing it as "a straight-up cover". The magazine's Alan Jones wrote, "I Will Survive is one of those songs l've always hated, but hot on the heels of Chantay Savage's sublime R&B-flavoured rendition which won favour last year, there's another highly enjoyable version from rising stars Cake. Lifted from their album, Fashion Nugget, it's powered by a funky bassline which dodges in and out of the vocals of John McCrea, whose tongue-in-cheek rendition is enhanced by his habit of letting his vocals trail a little behind the rest of the track."

Track listing
 CD single
 "I Will Survive" (radio edit) – 4:14
 "Rock 'n' Roll Lifestyle" – 4:12

Charts

Certifications

Leah McFall version
The Voice UK contestant, Leah McFall, performed the song on the first live show in the style of Chantay Savage. Following the programme, the studio recording of the performance was released and reached number three on UK iTunes. The song debuted at number sixteen on the UK Singles Chart on June 9, 2013, and in the following week it reached number eight.

Charts

Samples
 South Korean girl group Ive sampled "I Will Survive" during the instrumental break in their single "After Like".
 Robbie Williams' song "Supreme" samples the string section in the middle of "I Will Survive"
 Miley Cyrus' song "Flowers" reportedly interpolates "I Will Survive".

See also
List of Cash Box Top 100 number-one singles of 1979

References

External links
 

1978 songs
1978 singles
1993 singles
1996 singles
Billboard Hot 100 number-one singles
Billie Jo Spears songs
Cake (band) songs
Capricorn Records singles
Cashbox number-one singles
Celia Cruz songs
Chantay Savage songs
Diana Ross songs
Dutch Top 40 number-one singles
Gloria Gaynor songs
Irish Singles Chart number-one singles
Jenni Rivera songs
LGBT-related songs
Motown singles
Polydor Records singles
RCA Records singles
Shirley Bassey songs
Songs with feminist themes
Songs written by Dino Fekaris
Songs written by Freddie Perren
UK Singles Chart number-one singles
United States National Recording Registry recordings